"Show Me" was the only commercial single taken from Moya's Grammy-nominated 2003 album Two Horizons. This was Moya's first single under her new name (all previous singles were released under "Máire Brennan"), and her first single available to download (via iTunes USA). The cover shows a photography by Peer Lindgreen.

Other versions (featuring various lyrics from the original song) of 'Show Me' have also been remixed by the likes of Schiller.

Concept
As the album had a concept of a story being told, 'Show Me' had its own story. Described by Brennan as "being shown the way - where to go to find this harp".

Track listing 
"Show Me"
"Show Me" (Jakatta remix)

References

2003 singles
Songs written by Ross Cullum
2003 songs